The 2009–10 Mississippi State Bulldogs men's basketball team represented Mississippi State University in the 2009–10 college basketball season. This was head coach Rick Stansbury's twelfth season at Mississippi State. The Bulldogs competed in the Southeastern Conference and played their home games at Humphrey Coliseum, nicknamed The Hump. They finished the season 24–12, 9–7 in SEC play. They advanced to the championship game where they were defeated by Kentucky in overtime. They were invited to the 2010 National Invitation Tournament where they advanced to the second round before being defeated by North Carolina.

Previous season 
The 2008–09 Bulldogs finished the season 23–13 (9–7 in SEC play). The Bulldogs won the 2009 SEC men's basketball tournament, allowing them to advance to the NCAA Tournament, where they lost to Washington in the Round of 64.

Before the season

Departures
Four players from the 2008–09 team did not return for this season.

Recruits

Roster
Because the Bulldogs were one player above the scholarship limit, Jarvis Varnado gave his scholarship up so that no one on the team would have to leave, making him a walk-on. Renardo Sidney was suspended for the entire season over recruitment violations.

Rankings

Schedule and results
Source
All times are Central

|-
!colspan=9| Exhibition

|-
!colspan=9| Regular Season

|-
!colspan=10| 2010 SEC men's basketball tournament

|-
!colspan=10| 2010 National Invitation Tournament

References

Mississippi State Bulldogs men's basketball seasons
Mississippi State
Mississippi State
Bull
Bull